The Age-Related Payments Act 2004 (c 10) is an Act of the Parliament of the United Kingdom.

Equivalent provision is made for Northern Ireland by the Age-Related Payments (Northern Ireland) Order 2004 (S.I. 2004/1987) (N.I. 11).

Section 2 - Entitlement: basic cases
The word "or" at the end of section 2(3)(b)(i) is prospectively inserted by section 9(3)(a) of, and paragraph 16 of Schedule 2 to, the Welfare Reform Act 2009.

Section 2(3)(b)(iii), with the preceding "or", is prospectively repealed by sections 9(3)(b) and 58(1) of, and Part 1 of Schedule 7 to, that Act.

Section 7 - Power to provide for payments
The Age-Related Payments Regulations 2005 (SI 2005/1983) were made under this section.

Section 8 - Interpretation
The definition of "income support" in section 8(1) is prospectively repealed by sections 9(3)(b) and 58(1) of, and Part 1 of Schedule 7 to, the Welfare Reform Act 2009.

References
Halsbury's Statutes,

External links
The Age-Related Payments Act 2004, as amended from the National Archives.
The Age-Related Payments Act 2004, as originally enacted from the National Archives.

United Kingdom Acts of Parliament 2004